Julia Daudet, born Julia Allard (13 July 1844 – 23 April 1940), was a French writer, poet and journalist. She was the wife and collaborator of Alphonse Daudet, mother of Léon Daudet, Lucien Daudet and Edmée Daudet.

Biography 
Julia Allard grew up in the Marais neighbourhood in Paris, France. Her parents were interested in literature and hosted a salon frequented by Marceline Desbordes-Valmore. Julia published a collection of poetry when she was 17 years old under the name Marguerite Tournay.

On 29 January 1867 she married Alphonse Daudet and became his collaborator. The couple had a summer home in Champrosay that is now a cultural centre.  Julia Daudet was also known for her salon in Paris, which was famous for its Thursday receptions, attended by writers and poets such as Edmond de Goncourt, Hélène Vacaresco, Maurice Barrès, Émile Zola, Édouard Drumont, Rosemonde Gérard-Rostand, Guy de Maupassant, Ernest Renan, Arthur Meyer, Léon Gambetta and Rachilde. She published articles in many journals, including the Journal Officiel, as a literary critic under the pseudonym "Karl Steen". She was an active member of the jury of the Prix Fémina, which gave her a venue to continue her literary activity after the death of her husband Alphonse Daudet in 1897.

In 1913, through her son Lucien Daudet, who was a good friend of Marcel Proust, she was one of the first readers of the manuscript of Remembrance of Things Past. She was immediately taken with the text and encouraged the author to persevere at a time when he was doubting his talent, since the novel had been rejected by many editors. In 1922 she became a chevalier of the Legion of honour. She died in Paris at the age of 95.

Works 
 L'enfance d'une Parisienne, 1883
 Enfants et mères…, Lemerre, 1889
 Poésies, Lemerre, 1895
 Reflets sur le sable et sur l'eau, Lemerre, 1903
 Miroirs et mirages, Fasquelle, 1905
 Au bord des terrasses, Lemerre, 1907
 Souvenirs autour d'un groupe littéraire, Charpentier, 1910
 Quand Odile saura lire, Crès, 1919
 Journal de famille et de guerre, 1914–1919, Fasquelle, 1920
 Lumières et reflets, Lemerre, 1920

Notes and references

External links 
 Notice par Alphonse Séché, suivie de quelques poèmes

1844 births
1940 deaths
Daudet family
French women poets
19th-century French poets
French literary critics
French women literary critics
20th-century French poets
Burials at Père Lachaise Cemetery
20th-century French women writers
19th-century women writers